Nimal may refer to

Nimal Bandara, Sri Lankan politician 
Nimal Gamini Amaratunga, Sri Lankan judge
Nimal Gunaratne, Sri Lankan air force officer
Nimal Mendis, Sri Lankan politician
Nimal Piyatissa (born 1968), Sri Lankan politician
Nimal Rajapakshe, Sri Lankan academic
Nimal Senanayake, Sri Lankan neurologist, physician
Nimal Siripala de Silva, Sri Lankan politician
Nimal Wijesinghe, Sri Lankan politician
Baboo Nimal, Indian field hockey player
Hiranna M. Nimal, Indian field hockey player
S. H. Nimal Kumar, Sri Lankan Red Cross secretary

Sinhalese masculine given names